Material flow is the description of the transportation of raw materials, pre-fabricates, parts, components, integrated objects and final products as a flow of entities. The term applies mainly to advanced modeling of supply chain management.

As industrial material flow can easily become very complex, several different specialized simulation tools have been developed for complex systems. Typical tools are:
 AnyLogic
 AutoMod for logistics systems
 Plant Simulation for production system

References

Control engineering
Industrial ecology
Industrial engineering
Systems ecology
Resource economics